Heterodera arenaria is a plant pathogenic nematode.

References 

arenaria
Plant pathogenic nematodes
Nematodes described in 1955